The 2009 Schickedanz Open was a professional tennis tournament played on outdoor red clay courts. It was part of the 2009 ATP Challenger Tour. It took place in Fürth, Germany between 1 and 7 June 2009.

Singles entrants

Seeds

 Rankings are as of May 25, 2009.

Other entrants
The following players received wildcards into the singles main draw:
  Peter Gojowczyk
  Jeremy Jahn
  Daniel Köllerer
  Marc Meigel

The following player received entry into the main draw as Special Exempt:
  Dustin Brown
  Florian Mayer

The following players received entry from the qualifying draw:
  Thiemo de Bakker
  Peter Luczak
  Eduardo Schwank
  Louk Sorensen

The following player received the lucky loser spot:
  Miguel Ángel López Jaén

Champions

Singles

 Peter Luczak def.  Juan Pablo Brzezicki, 6–2, 6–0

Doubles

 Rubén Ramírez Hidalgo /  Santiago Ventura def.  Simon Greul /  Alessandro Motti, 4–6, 6–1, [10–6]

References
Official website
ITF search 
2009 Draws

Schickedanz Open
Schickedanz Open
Schickedanz Open
Franken Challenge